Scomberesox is a genus of sauries. It is one of two in the family Scomberesocidae. The generic name Scomberesox is a he name id a compound of scomber, which in turn is derived from the Greek skombros, meaning "mackerel", and the Latin esox meaning pike.

Species
There are currently three recognized species in this genus:
 Scomberesox saurus (Walbaum, 1792) (Atlantic saury)
 Scomberesox scombroides (J. Richardson, 1843) (King gar)
 Scomberesox simulans (C. L. Hubbs & Wisner, 1980) (Dwarf saury)

References

 
Scomberesocidae